The South Leicestershire Railway was founded in 1850 as the Nuneaton and Hinckley Railway, with parliamentary powers to build a  railway from  on the London and North Western Railway to  in Leicestershire. In 1860 Parliament authorised the company to extend its line to Wigston Junction on the Midland Railway and to rename itself the South Leicestershire Railway. The extension was completed in 1864 which included stations at Elmesthorpe (for Earl Shilton and Barwell), Croft, Narborough, Blaby and Wigston as well as sidings for the granite quarries at Stoney Stanton, Croft and Enderby.

The South Leicestershire Railway was taken over in 1867 by the LNWR, which in turn became part of the London, Midland and Scottish Railway in the 1923 grouping.

In the 1960s British Railways closed all of the South Leicestershire Railway's stations except Hinckley. However, public objections led BR to reopen  in 1970.

References

Railway companies established in 1860
Railway companies disestablished in 1867
London and North Western Railway
Rail transport in Leicestershire
Rail transport in Warwickshire
1867 disestablishments in England
1860 establishments in England
British companies established in 1860